James Robert Belden (October 31, 1956 – May 20, 2015) was an American saxophonist, arranger, composer, bandleader, and producer. As a composer he may be best known for his Grammy Award winning orchestral jazz recording, Black Dahlia (2001). As producer, he was mostly associated with the remastering of recordings by trumpeter Miles Davis for Columbia Records.

Biography 
Belden, born in Evanston, Illinois, grew up in the Charleston, South Carolina suburb of Goose Creek. He briefly attended the University of South Carolina where he met composer Jay Knowles who introduced him to the music of Gil Evans. He then studied saxophone and composition at the University of North Texas before joining the Woody Herman band.

He recorded his first album Treasure Island in 1990. This was followed by a series of adventurous albums featuring jazz-tinged arrangements of contemporary pop songs culminating with Black Dahlia in 2001.

In 2008, he arranged and produced Miles from India, a world fusion music recording based on the compositions of Miles Davis for which he assembled a group made up of Davis alumni and musicians from India.  In addition to his work as arranger, composer, conductor and A & R director, Belden contributed numerous liner notes for noted recordings, such as "Lou's Blues" by Lou Marini and the Magic City Jazz Orchestra.

Some of his work as the author of liner notes received Grammy Awards. In early 2015, Belden became the first American musician in 35 years to bring a band from the USA to perform in Iran.

Belden died of a heart attack on May 20, 2015, at Lenox Hill Hospital in Manhattan. He was 58.

Discography

As leader
 Treasure Island (Sunnyside, 1990)
 La Cigale (Sunnyside, 1990)
 Straight to My Heart: The Music of Sting (Blue Note, 1991)
 When the Doves Cry: The Music of Prince (Metro Blue, 1994)
 Shades of Blue (Blue Note, 1996)
 Bob Belden Presents: Strawberry Fields (Blue Note, 1996)
 Tapestry – The Blue Note Cover Series (Blue Note, 1997)
 Black Dahlia (Blue Note, 2001)
  Three Days of Rain (Sunnyside, 2006)

With Tim Hagans and Animation
 Re-Animation Live! (Blue Note, 1999)
 Animation - Imagination (Blue Note, 1999)
 Agemo (RareNoise, 2011)
 Asiento (RareNoise, 2011)
 Transparent Heart (RareNoise, 2012)
 Machine Language (RareNoise, 2015)

As conductor
 The Turning Point, McCoy Tyner Big Band (Verve, 1991)
 Journey, McCoy Tyner Big Band (Verve, 1993)
 100 Years of Latin Love Songs, Paquito D'Rivera (Heads Up, 1998)

With others 
 Incognito – Beneath the Surface, New York City Horns (Talkin' Loud, 1996)
 Mysterious Shorter,  Nicholas Payton, Sam Yahel, John Hart, Billy Drummond (Chesky, 2006)

See also 
 List of jazz arrangers

References and sources

External links 
Bob Belden interview, mixonline.com
Bob Belden biodata, vh1.com
Bob Belden interview, Columbiarecords.com
Review of the Black Dahlia recording, AllAboutJazz.com
"Lou's Blues", allaboutjazz.com
Review of Animation: Agemo, AllAboutJazz.com
Video: 
Video:  - arranged by Bob Belden.
 Video:  - Gil Evans-esque arrangement of operatic aria by Puccini

1956 births
2015 deaths
American music arrangers
American male composers
American composers
Record producers from Illinois
American bandleaders
University of North Texas College of Music alumni
Jazz arrangers
Musicians from Evanston, Illinois
Chesky Records artists
Male jazz musicians
Sunnyside Records artists